The Lower Cross River languages form a branch of the Cross River languages of Cross River State, Nigeria. They consist of the divergent Obolo language (or Andoni, 200,000 speakers), and the core of the branch, which includes the 4 million speakers of the Efik-Ibibio cluster.

Obolo
Lower Cross proper: Efik-Ibibio, Ibino (Ibeno), Oro (Oron), Okobo, Iko, Ebughu, Ilue, Enwang-Uda, Usaghade
Additionally, Ethnologue lists several more languages within the Efik-Ibibio cluster. (See Ibibio-Efik languages.)

Forde and Jones (1950) considered Ibino and Oro to be Efik-Ibibio.

Names and locations
Below is a list of language names, populations, and locations from Blench (2019).

Reconstructions
Proto-Lower Cross River has been reconstructed by Connell (n.d.)

See also
List of Proto-Lower Cross River reconstructions (Wiktionary)

References

Further reading
Connell, Bruce. n.d. Comparative Lower Cross wordlist. Unpublished manuscript.

 
Cross River languages